This article is about the particular significance of the decade 1700–1709 to Wales and its people.

Events
1700
Quaker emigrant Rowland Ellis is elected to represent Philadelphia in the provincial assembly.
1701
November - Humphrey Humphreys becomes Bishop of Hereford, and is replaced as Bishop of Bangor by John Evans.
Humphrey Mackworth becomes MP for Cardiganshire.
Edward Jones, Bishop of St Asaph, is temporarily removed from his position after being found guilty of simony and maladministration.
1702
23rd Regiment of Foot granted the title The Welsh Regiment of Fusiliers.
1703
Thomas Griffiths and a small group of followers settle at Welsh Tract, Delaware, where they found the Welsh Tract Baptist church.
Sir Roger Mostyn, 3rd Baronet, marries Lady Essex Finch.
1704
Jane Kemeys marries Sir John Tynte, 2nd Baronet, resulting in an alliance between two important families and the beginning of the Kemeys-Tynte dynasty.
July - Richard Vaughan of Corsygedol becomes Constable of Harlech Castle.
1705
George Bull becomes Bishop of St David's.
1706
Crickhowell Bridge rebuilt in stone.
Humphrey Mackworth's company grants £20 a year towards a charity school at Esgair Hir mine in Cardiganshire, £30 a year towards a minister there, and £20 a year towards a charity school at Neath.

1707

1708

Edmund Meyrick sets up a school at Carmarthen.
Charles Talbot, 1st Baron Talbot of Hensol, marries Cecil Mathew of Castell y Mynach in Pentyrch.

1709

Arts and literature

New books
1702
David Maurice - Cynffwrdd i'r gwan Gristion, neu'r gorsen ysig (translation from work of Theophilus Dorrington)
1703
Ellis Wynne - Gweledigaetheu y Bardd Cwsc
1704
Robert Nelson - A Companion for the Festivals and Fasts of the Church of England
1705
Myles Davies - The Recantation of Mr. Pollett, a Roman priest
Letters of Orinda to Poliarchus (the letters of Katherine Philips (posthumously published)
1706
William Jones - Synopsis Palmariorum Matheseos
1707
Edward Lhuyd - Archaeologia Britannica, vol. 1: Glossography

Births
1700
8 March – William Morgan the elder, of Tredegar, politician (d. 1731)
date unknown - Guto Nyth Brân, legendary athlete (d. 1737)
probable – Lewis Evans, surveyor (d. 1756)

1701
date unknown - Richard Trevor, bishop (d. 1771)

1702
20 May - Thomas Morgan, judge (d. 1769)
date unknown - Humphrey Owen, academic (d. 1768)

1703
2 February - Richard Morris, one of the celebrated Morris brothers of Anglesey (d. 1779)
probable - Henry Arthur Herbert, 4th Earl of Powis (d. 1772)
1704
May - Ann Maddocks, the "maid of Cefn Ydfa" (d. 1727)

1705
6 May - William Morris, botanist, one of the Morris brothers of Anglesey (d. 1763)

1707
1 February - Frederick, Prince of Wales (d. 1751)

1708
8 December - Charles Hanbury Williams, diplomat and satirist (d. 1759)
date unknown - John Pettingall, antiquary (d. 1781)

1709
date unknown
Joseph Hoare, academic (d. 1802)
David Williams, schoolmaster (d. 1784)

Deaths
1700
27 June - Hugh Owen, Independent minister, 60?
11 July - William Williams, Speaker of the House of Commons, 66
September – Sir John Aubrey, 2nd Baronet, politician
8 December - Edward Harley, politician, 76
16 December - Thomas Morgan (of Dderw), politician, 36 (smallpox)
1701
date unknown - Sir John Hanmer, 3rd Baronet (in a duel)
1702
January - James Annesley, 3rd Earl of Anglesey, 31
25 March - Lewis Wogan, High Sheriff of Pembrokeshire, age unknown
1703
10 May - Edward Jones, Bishop of St Asaph, 62
1704
May - William Wynne, historian
1705
date unknown - Lionel Wafer, explorer, 65
1707
date unknown - Edward Ravenscroft, dramatist
1708
1 December - William Wogan, politician
1709
30 June - Edward Lhuyd, naturalist, 49
1717
20 May - John Trevor lawyer and politician, expelled Speaker of the House of Commons, c.80
1720
7 March - John Morgan (of Rhiwpera), politician, 49
22 August - Sir Thomas Powell, 1st Baronet, politician, about 55
29 August - Charles Williams, merchant, 87
1725
18 January - Hugh Cholmondeley, 1st Earl of Cholmondeley, Lord Lieutenant of North Wales, 62
25 July - Rev Thomas Griffith, 80, first pastor of Welsh Tract Baptist Church, Delaware, USA.
29 November - William Jones, 49, Principal of Jesus College, Oxford.
15 December - Francis Edwardes, politician
1790
4 March - Samuel Hallifax, Bishop of St Asaph, 57
20 March - Thomas Richards of Coychurch, cleric and lexicographer, 80
24 August - John Worgan, organist and composer, 66
16 October - Daniel Rowland, Methodist leader, c.79
5 November - Michael Lort, clergyman, academic and antiquary, 65

References

 
18th century in Wales
Wales
Wales
Decades in Wales